Heart Songs is a 1994 collection of short stories by Annie Proulx. Most of the stories in the 1994 collection had previously been published as Heart Songs and Other Stories in 1988.

References

American short story collections
Works by Annie Proulx
1988 short story collections